One Simple Wish is a non-profit that uses technology to raise awareness about foster care and connect caring people to kids in need. One Simple Wish had developed a unique wish granting platform that allows anyone to browse and grant wishes made by young people impacted by foster care and those in under-served communities.   Examples of granted wishes include bikes, laptops, books, eye glasses, tickets to concerts and shows, clothing, and playground equipment.

History
One Simple Wish was founded in August 2008 in Ewing, New Jersey, by Danielle Gletow. As a 501(c)(3) organization, One Simple Wish has been granting wishes to foster children and impoverished or vulnerable families on a national scale. The store front, commonly called the "Wish Shop" or "Dress Shop", has been part of this organization since June 2010.
The Wish Shop closed in July 2010 due to a lack of funding and the Board of Directors' desire to focus more closely on the Wish Granting and Wish To Work programs.

Programs
Wish Granting: The Wish Granting program is One Simple Wish's core program and each year grants more than 1,000 wishes to foster children and vulnerable families through their website. Wishes range in value from $5–$100 and include items like sports equipment, shoes and clothing, tickets to museums, small appliances, and gift cards.

References

External links

Charities based in New Jersey
Children's charities based in the United States
Organizations established in 2008
Social welfare charities based in the United States